The 1900–01 Football League season was Small Heath Football Club's ninth in the Football League and their seventh in the Second Division. They finished runners-up in the 18-team league, so were promoted to the First Division for 1901–02. They also took part in the 1900–01 FA Cup, entering at the first round proper and losing in the third round to Aston Villa after a replay. In locally organised competition, they lost to West Bromwich Albion in the first round of the Birmingham Senior Cup and to Aston Villa in the semi-final of the Lord Mayor of Birmingham's Charity Cup.

Twenty-three players made at least one appearance in nationally organised first-team competition, and there were thirteen different goalscorers. Full-back Arthur Archer and half-back Walter Wigmore were ever-present over the 39-match season; goalkeeper Nat Robinson and forward Sid Wharton each missed only one match. Johnny McMillan was leading scorer with 14 goals in all competitions; he and Bob McRoberts each scored 13 in the league.

Football League Second Division

League table (part)

FA Cup

Appearances and goals

References
General
 Matthews, Tony (1995). Birmingham City: A Complete Record. Breedon Books (Derby). .
 Matthews, Tony (2010). Birmingham City: The Complete Record. DB Publishing (Derby). .
 Source for match dates and results: "Birmingham City 1900–1901: Results". Statto Organisation. Retrieved 23 May 2012.
 Source for lineups, appearances, goalscorers and attendances: Matthews (2010), Complete Record, pp. 246–47. Note that attendance figures are estimated.
 Source for kit: "Birmingham City". Historical Football Kits. Retrieved 22 May 2018.

Specific

Birmingham City F.C. seasons
Small Heath